St. Andrew's Episcopal Chapel is an historic Episcopal chapel located at Sudlersville, Queen Anne's County, Maryland, built as a chapel of ease for St. Luke's Church in Church Hill. It was listed on the National Register of Historic Places in 1984.

A small Carpenter Gothic-style board-and-batten structure constructed in 1878, it divided into two principal parts: a large rectangular sanctuary three bays long and two bays wide with a steeply pitched gable roof, and a slightly smaller but similarly proportioned chancel, two bays long and one bay wide. The entry features a wide Gothic-arched double doorway with a steep gable roof. The sanctuary has a pair of stained glass lancet windows on the first floor, and a circular stained glass rose window in the upper gable.

References

External links

, including photo from 1978, at Maryland Historical Trust

Episcopal church buildings in Maryland
Churches in Queen Anne's County, Maryland
Churches on the National Register of Historic Places in Maryland
Churches completed in 1878
19th-century Episcopal church buildings
Carpenter Gothic church buildings in Maryland
National Register of Historic Places in Queen Anne's County, Maryland
Episcopal chapels in the United States